Sindrit Guri (born 23 October 1993) is an Albanian professional footballer who plays as a forward for Süper Lig club İstanbulspor and the Albania national team.

Club career

Early career
Guri first joined local side Vllaznia in 2005 at the age of 12, where he played for the academy side at different age groups before being promoted to the first team during the 2011–12 season, where he made his professional debut in an Kategoria Superiore match against Apolonia on 19 November 2011, coming on as a late substitute for Xhevahir Sukaj in the 4–1 away win. He went on to make 9 league and 2 cup appearances under Rudi Vata during his debut season, as his side finished mid table in the league and reached the quarter finals of the Albanian Cup.

Kukësi
On 7 June 2016, Guri joined Kukësi on a free transfer, returning in Kategoria Superiore after one season absence. He was presented on the same day where he officially signed the contract.

On 7 July, in the second leg of 2016–17 UEFA Europa League first qualifying round against Rudar Pljevlja, Guri made his Kukësi debut as well as his European debut by coming on as a second-half substitute and scored the winner in the 79th minute, helping the team to win 1–0 and to progress to the second round with the aggregate 2–1.

Guri become Kukësi's first striker for the 2017–18 season following the departure of Pero Pejić and Izair Emini. He made his UEFA Champions League debut on 12 July in the first leg of second qualifying round versus Sheriff Tiraspol as Kukësi lost 0–1. He also played in the returning leg at Elbasan Arena as Kukësi won 2–1 but was eliminated on away goal rule.

Guri begun the domestic season on 6 September by playing in the 2017 Albanian Supercup against Tirana as Kukësi lost 0–1 at Selman Stërmasi Stadium. He scored his first goals of the season in form of a brace in the 4–0 home win over Egnatia in the first leg of 2017–18 Albanian Cup first round. Guri's first league goal came on matchday 5 at newbie Lushnja, netting the opener with a shot from 25 yards as Kukësi won 2–0. He added another two at cup as Kukësi won 4–1 at Erzeni in the first leg of second round.

Guri enjoyed a fine form in 2018, notably netting in each leg of cup's quarter-final as Kukësi saw off Tirana to progress to semi-finals; he reached double-figures in the process. This was followed by a brace in the league encounter versus Partizani, including one in the 96th minute as Kukësi won 3–1 to continue their battle for the second position. His performances were rewarded as he was named Albanian Superliga Player of the Month for February 2018.

On 8 April, Guri confirmed that he would leave Kukësi at the end of 2017–18 season with the aim of playing with a top league club. Six days later, he scored three goals, including a free-kick, in the 4–0 home win over third-placed team Partizani, recording his first top flight hat-trick. He also reached the 20-goal landmark and also become the first player to score a hat-trick versus capital club since Skerdi Bejzade in 2004. Later that month, he scored a second-half winner against Skënderbeu to give Kukësi the first win at the opposition turf since September 2013. His performances earned him another Player of the Month award, becoming the first player in history to win in twice in a season.

On the final day of the season, Guri scored a free-kick in the 2–2 home draw versus Flamurtari to finish the season with 21 goals from 34 appearances, one goal short from winning the Golden Boot. He also scored 7 goals in Albanian Cup, finishing it as top scorer jointly with Laçi's Redon Xhixha.

Oostende
On 15 May 2018, it was announced that Guri would join K.V. Oostende of Belgian First Division A, on a three-year contract starting from 1 July. Kukësi earned €710,000 from the transfer and also retained part ownership. Guri however joined the team in mid-June and scored a brace in his first match for his new side.

He made his official debut for the team on 28 July in the opening match of championship versus Royal Excel Mouscron, setting up the first goal in an eventual 2–1 home win. Guri's first goal came in his second appearance for the club on 5 August, netting in the second half of the 5–2 loss to Anderlecht.

Shkëndija
On 4 September 2021, he joined Shkëndija in the Macedonian First Football League on a one-year deal.

International career
Guri was called up to the Albania U19 side for the 2012 UEFA European Under-19 Championship qualification. He made his debut on 5 October 2011 in the 1–0 defeat to Denmark, where he played for 57 minutes. He went on to play the remaining two matches as Albania finished the Group 12 in the third position, failing to secure a spot for 2012 UEFA European Under-19 Championship.

On 21 May 2018, following a good run on club level, Guri received his first senior call-up by manager Christian Panucci for the friendlies against Kosovo and Ukraine. He started the game against Kosovo, thus earning his first senior cap, making a good overall performance for around 70 minutes before making place for defender Mërgim Mavraj.

Style of play
Guri is an elegant striker, who is known for having an eye for goal. A technically good footballer, he is also strong in aerial duels, possessing a powerful header.

Personal life
Guri currently resideis in Tirana; he is married and has a child, born in 2016. He stated that his favourite footballer is Argentine international Lionel Messi.

Career statistics

Club

International

Honours

Club
Kukësi
Kategoria Superiore: 2016–17
Albanian Supercup: 2016

Individual
Albanian Superliga Player of the Month: February 2018, April 2018
Albanian Cup top goalscorer: 2017–18

References

External links

FSHF profile

1993 births
Footballers from Shkodër
Living people
Albanian footballers
Albania youth international footballers
Albania international footballers
Association football forwards
KF Vllaznia Shkodër players
Besa Kavajë players
KS Kastrioti players
KF Korabi Peshkopi players
FK Kukësi players
K.V. Oostende players
KF Shkëndija players
İstanbulspor footballers
Kategoria Superiore players
Kategoria e Parë players
Belgian Pro League players
Macedonian First Football League players
Süper Lig players
Albanian expatriate footballers
Expatriate footballers in Belgium
Albanian expatriate sportspeople in Belgium
Expatriate footballers in North Macedonia
Albanian expatriate sportspeople in North Macedonia
Expatriate footballers in Turkey
Albanian expatriate sportspeople in Turkey